Satyrium pumilum is a species of orchid endemic to southwestern Cape Province.

References 

pumilum
Endemic orchids of South Africa